Gunson is a surname. Notable people with the surname include:

Ella Gunson (born 1989), New Zealand field hockey player
Gordon Gunson (1904–1991), English footballer
James Gunson (1877–1963), New Zealand businessman and politician
Joe Gunson (1863–1942), American baseball player
Lyn Gunson (born 1953), former netball player and coach from New Zealand